The Journal of Neuroimmunology is a peer-reviewed scientific journal established in 1981 which focuses on the relationship between the nervous system and the immune system. It is published by Elsevier and the editor-in-chief is Michael Racke (Ohio State University College of Medicine). According to the Journal Citation Reports, the journal has a 2021 impact factor of 3.221.

References

External links

Neuroscience journals
Immunology journals
Publications established in 1981
Elsevier academic journals